Sergino is a rural locality (a selo) in Ikryaninsky Selsoviet, Ikryaninsky District, Astrakhan Oblast, Russia. The population was 167 as of 2010. There are 4 streets.

Geography 
Sergino is located 9 km west of Ikryanoye (the district's administrative centre) by road. Borkino is the nearest rural locality.

References 

Rural localities in Ikryaninsky District